Binley is a suburb in the east of Coventry, England. Binley evolved from a small mining village on the outskirts of Coventry to a large residential area composing private residences and council-owned properties. It is famous for the Binley Mega Chippy, which is located within Binley.

History
Binley colliery started producing coal in 1911 and was most productive during the 1950s, the entrance was on Willenhall Lane. It closed in 1963 and Herald Way industrial estate now occupies the site. Former pit worker cottages still remain along Willenhall Lane and St James Lane.

Binley is flanked by Willenhall to the south (separated by the Coventry to Euston railway line), Stoke Aldermoor to the west (separated by Allard Way road), and the Warwickshire village of Binley Woods to the east, which almost joins Binley since the construction of the Eastern Bypass, a B&Q store and a T.G.I. Friday's restaurant between the two areas. The final side is Copsewood, leading to Wyken in one direction, and Stoke the other.

In the early 1970s, a new housing estate called Ernesford Grange was built adjacent to Binley. Many of the new closes were named after miners who were well known in the community; William McKee, George Robertson, and Sam Gault being examples. Binley grew further in the 1990s with a large housing estate being constructed to the east of the old schools and extending to Brinklow Road (near to Coombe Country Park).

The flight path of the Coventry Airport in the nearby village Baginton runs just to the east of Binley.

The buildings of the old Binley school became "Lino's Restaurant", which was demolished in 2007 to make way for new housing. The three other Binley schools disappeared in the early 1980s to make way for a large industrial and office complex.

According to the 2011 census, there were 16,691 residents.

Places
The construction of St Bartholomew's Church was funded by Lord Craven. It was consecrated in 1772, with its 200th anniversary being celebrated in 1972. It has a grey slate roof, and its walls consist of light-coloured stone which appear grey after being coloured with a cement wash.
The local social club has been serving Binley locals since 1929. The club holds thousands of members. They have a local pool team / darts team / golf team / snooker team and two large venue rooms for hire.

Binley Mega Chippy

The suburb is the location of the Binley Mega Chippy, a fish and chip shop opened in 2004. In early 2022, users on social networking platforms Twitter and TikTok started sharing ironic memes about the chip shop. A jingle about the chip shop was created and the venue went viral on the internet making the owners a purported £1.5K from the sale of their extra-large battered sausages. A hashtag "#BinleyMegaChippy" was viewed online nearly 235 million times by June 2022. Users of the online gaming platform Roblox had created numerous games about the chip shop. The chip shop began to receive tourists from across the UK documenting their visit. Staff at the shop admitted their initial confusion about the sudden surge in popularity. Local shoppers were also confused by the venue's sudden popularity. By 30 May, the venue had become so well known that it received visitors from Scotland, Portugal, and Australia. The shop had to hire four additional staff members to help with the increased demand.

References

Suburbs of Coventry